Jason O. Ferguson (born November 28, 1974) is a former American football defensive tackle in the National Football League (NFL)  for the New York Jets, Dallas Cowboys, and Miami Dolphins. He was selected by the New York Jets in the seventh round of the 1997 NFL Draft. He played college football at the University of Georgia.

Early years
Ferguson attended Nettleton High School in Nettleton, Mississippi. He earned varsity letters in football, as a center on the basketball team, and in track and field. In football, he was a two-time All-South and a three-time All-District honoree.

College career
Ferguson enrolled at Itawamba Community College. He was a two-time All-Area and an All-State honoree. As a sophomore in 1994, he also earned Junior College All-American status, after recording 88 tackles and 2.5 sacks.

Ferguson originally intended to go Ole Miss from Itawamba, but switched to Georgia in the final 72 hours before 1995 National Signing Day.

Playing for the Georgia Bulldogs in 1995 and 1996, he lined up next to Jermaine Smith in Georgia's defensive front. In a memorable game against Auburn, Ferguson sacked quarterback Dameyune Craig on fourth-and-3 in the fourth overtime, sealing Georgia's 56-49 win.

Professional career

New York Jets

Falling to the seventh round of the 1997 NFL Draft, Ferguson was selected 229th overall by Bill Parcells' New York Jets. The Jets were the only club to invite him for a visit before the draft, because most teams apparently dissuaded from considering him after he was tested positive for marijuana at the pre-draft combine, reportedly being the only player to do so. Seventeen defensive tackles were taken ahead of him, including Darrell Russell and Renaldo Wynn in the first round. Parcells originally expressed reluctance to pick Ferguson at all, but trusted Georgia's head coach, Jim Donnan. Ferguson was signed to a two-year deal by the Jets only few days after the draft.

In his first season with the Jets, Ferguson shared time with veteran Ernie Logan at nose tackle, before replacing him as starter at the beginning of the 1998 NFL season. In 1999, Ferguson was suspended for four games after testing positive for steroids. After earning a $12 million contract during the 2000–2001 offseason, Ferguson tore his right rotator cuff during the first practice and missed all of the 2001 NFL season. He returned to the field to following season and played all games in 2002, 2003 and 2004.

Dallas Cowboys
A highly coveted free-agent in 2005, coming off a very strong 2004 season in which he totaled 59 tackles and 3½ sacks, Ferguson left the Jets for the Dallas Cowboys, rejoining Bill Parcells who had become their head coach in 2003. Ferguson was signed to a five-year, $21.5 million contract that included a $9 million signing bonus. A replacement for La'Roi Glover most of the season, Ferguson started three games in 2005. After Glover left for the Rams in 2006, Ferguson took over as full-time starter.

Following a season-ending biceps injury in the Cowboys' victory over the New York Giants in Week 1 of the 2007 season, Ferguson lost his starting job to Jay Ratliff. That following off-season he was traded to the Miami Dolphins in exchange for a sixth round draft pick in the 2009 NFL Draft (#197-Stephen Hodge). The teams also swapped their 2008 sixth-rounders (#167-Erik Walden), with the Cowboys moving up from the bottom third to the top of that round.

Miami Dolphins

Rejoining Bill Parcells on a third team, Ferguson became the Dolphins' starting nose tackle in 2008. He then appeared in all games and, as of November 2009, had compiled 55 tackles (33 solo). In 2008, the Dolphins' opponents averaged only 101.3 rushing yards per game, and 4.2 yards per carry.

In a game against the Carolina Panthers on November 19, Ferguson suffered right knee injury that caused him to miss the rest of the 2009 NFL season. Considering his age and the fact that he is playing on the last year of his contract, it was believed that this injury would end his 13-year tenure as an NFL player because he planned to either re-sign with the Dolphins, or retire.

On March 6, 2010, Ferguson was suspended for the first eight games of the 2010 NFL season. He was penalized for taking steroids, the second time he failed the NFL drug test. Three days later, he re-signed with the Dolphins. However, on July 15, Ferguson announced his retirement from the NFL.

References

External links
Miami Dolphins bio

1974 births
Living people
Players of American football from Mississippi
African-American players of American football
American football defensive tackles
Itawamba Indians football players
Georgia Bulldogs football players
New York Jets players
Dallas Cowboys players
Miami Dolphins players
People from Nettleton, Mississippi
21st-century African-American sportspeople
20th-century African-American sportspeople